Lachesis (from  , 'to obtain by lot, by fate, or by the will of the gods'), in ancient Greek religion, was the second of the Three Fates, or Moirai; the others were her sisters, Clotho and Atropos.  Normally seen clothed in white, Lachesis is the measurer of the thread spun on Clotho's spindle, and in some texts, determines Destiny, or thread of life. Her Roman equivalent was Decima. Lachesis was the apportioner, deciding how much time for life was to be allowed for each person or being. She measured the thread of life with her rod. She is also said to choose a person's destiny after a thread was measured. In mythology, it is said that she appears with her sisters within three days of a baby's birth to decide the baby's fate.

Origin
According to Hesiod's Theogony, Lachesis and her sisters were the daughters of Erebus (Darkness) and Nyx (Night), though later in the same work (ll. 901-906) they are said to have been born of Zeus and Themis. Lachesis is also mentioned in the tenth book of the Republic of Plato as the daughter of Necessity. She instructs the souls who are about to choose their next life, assign them lots, and presents them all of the kinds, human and animal, from which they may choose their next life.

Namesake
Lachesis is a genus of pit vipers sometimes called bushmasters. It includes the largest venomous snake in the Western Hemisphere.'References

Further reading
Thomas Blisniewski: Kinder der dunkelen Nacht. Die Ikonographie der Parzen vom späten Mittelalter bis zum späten XVIII.'' Jahrhundert. Dissertation Cologne 1992. Berlin 1992.

External links
 
 
 

Moirai
Greek goddesses
Children of Zeus
Time and fate goddesses
Textiles in folklore
Personifications in Greek mythology

id:Moirai#Lakhesis